Euclera cassotis is a moth of the subfamily Arctiinae first described by Herbert Druce in 1883. It is found in Ecuador and the Amazon region.

References

Arctiinae